Astelia menziesiana is a species of plant in the Asteliaceae family that is endemic to the state of Hawaii in the United States. Hawaiian names for the plant are kaluaha, paʻiniu, or puaʻakuhinia.  It is a non-woody, clumping plant that grows from 1 to 3 feet in width/height. The plant can grow on tree branches and trunks as an epiphyte or in the ground. Leaves are silvery-green or green on top; undersides may be white, gold or silver. Flowers bloom in long spikes in colors including yellow, purple and red. Male and female flowers are on separate plants. Female plants have small orange-yellow berries which are eaten by birds. Two other species: Astelia argyrocoma and the rare and endangered A. waialealae are restricted to the island of Kauaʻi.

References

External links
 Astelia menziesiana: Kaluaha, pua'akuhinia Board of Water Supply (accessed September 24, 2015)
 Plants for Hawaiian Lei -- Pa'iniu (accessed September 24, 2015)

Asteliaceae
Endemic flora of Hawaii
Flora without expected TNC conservation status